Kerry Lee Powell is a Canadian writer, whose debut short story collection Willem de Kooning's Paintbrush was a longlisted nominee for the Scotiabank Giller Prize, and a shortlisted nominee for the Rogers Writers' Trust Fiction Prize and the Governor General's Award for English-language fiction, in 2016.

Originally from Montreal, Quebec, she is currently based in Moncton, New Brunswick. She has also published the poetry collections Inheritance and The Wreckage, and was a shortlisted Gerald Lampert Award finalist in 2015 for Inheritance.

References

External links

21st-century Canadian poets
21st-century Canadian short story writers
Canadian women poets
Canadian women short story writers
Writers from Moncton
Writers from Montreal
Living people
21st-century Canadian women writers
Year of birth missing (living people)